The 2003 Great Yarmouth Borough Council election took place on 1 May 2003 to elect members of Great Yarmouth Borough Council in Norfolk, England. One third of the council was up for election and the Conservative Party stayed in overall control of the council.

After the election, the composition of the council was:
Conservative 26
Labour 22

Election result
Overall turnout at the election was 30.32%.

Ward results

References

2003 English local elections
2003
2000s in Norfolk